Angelo Panzetta (born June 24, 1967) is a retired American soccer defender who played professionally in the Major Indoor Soccer League and National Professional Soccer League. He coached the Allegheny College men’s soccer team for 21-years. His tenure started in 2001 and ended in 2022.

Player

College
Panzetta attended the Rochester Institute of Technology where he was a three-time, First Team, NCAA Division III All American soccer player. In 1988, the Tigers lost to UC San Diego in the final of the NCAA Men's Division III Soccer Championship.  He graduated in 1989 with a degree in applied mathematics. In 1994, RIT inducted Panzetta into its Athletic Hall of Fame.

Professional
In 1989, the Baltimore Blast selected Panzetta in the first round (eighth overall) of the Major Indoor Soccer League amateur draft. In January 1991, he suffered a season ending knee injury. The Blast released him on October 9, 1991. On October 19, 1991, Panzetta signed with the Harrisburg Heat of the National Professional Soccer League. Panzetta played until 1994 and is a member of the Heat Hall of Fame.

Coach
On May 13, 1994, Syracuse University hired Panzetta as an assistant to its men’s soccer team. In 2001, he moved to Allegheny College as head coach.

References

External links
MISL stats
Allegheny Gators: Angelo Panzetta

Living people
1967 births
American soccer coaches
American soccer players
Baltimore Blast (1980–1992) players
Harrisburg Heat players
Major Indoor Soccer League (1978–1992) players
National Professional Soccer League (1984–2001) players
Association football defenders